The Dragon of Pendragon Castle is a 1950 English family film directed and produced by John Baxter.
The film features Leslie Bradley, David Hannaford, Lily Lapidus, and Hubert Leslie in the lead roles.

Plot
Mr. Ferber (Leslie Bradley) is an old man living in Pendragon Castle along with his two grandchildren Bobby(David Hannaford) and Paddy (Graham Moffatt) who find a small dragon to heat their castle. The dragon helps them to find hidden  treasure in the castle.

Cast 
 Leslie Bradley as Mr. Ferber
 David Hannaford as Bobby
 Lily Lapidus as Mrs. Morgan
 Hubert Leslie as Sir William Magnus
 Graham Moffatt as Paddy
 Robin Netscher as Peter Fielding
 Hilary Rennie as Judy Fielding
 C. Denier Warren as Mr. Morgan
 Jane Welsh as Mrs. Fielding

References

External links 

1950s English-language films
British children's fantasy films
Films directed by John Baxter
British black-and-white films
Films about dragons
Films set in castles
1950s children's films
1950s children's fantasy films
1950s British films